The Bequaert's miner bee (Perdita bequaerti) is a species of miner bee in the family Andrenidae. Another common name for this species is the Bequaert's perdita. It is found in North America.

Subspecies
These two subspecies belong to the species Perdita bequaerti:
 Perdita bequaerti bequaerti
 Perdita bequaerti indianensis Cockerell, 1922

References

Further reading

 
 

Andrenidae
Articles created by Qbugbot
Insects described in 1917